Garner v. Teamsters Local 776, 346 U.S. 485 (1953), is a US labor law case, concerning the scope of federal preemption against state law for labor rights.

Facts
Garner claimed that a dispute over picketing was not governed by federal law in the National Labor Relations Act of 1935, but by state law. Garner ran a trucking business with 24 employees, four members of the Teamsters Union. The union placed rotating pickets, of people who did not work for the business, at the platform for loading onto trucks, holding signs saying "Local 776 Teamsters Union (A.F. of L.) wants Employees of Central Storage & Transfer Co. to join them to gain union wages, hours and working conditions." Drivers and other carriers refused to cross the picket, and the business fell by 95%. A Pennsylvania court found this violated the Pennsylvania Labor Relations Act and the Supreme Court of Pennsylvania decided that the issue fell within the NLRB's jurisdiction to prevent unfair labor practices.

Judgment
Jackson J decided the Pennsylvania statute was preempted from providing superior remedies or processing claims quicker than the NLRB because "the Board was vested with power to entertain petitioners’ grievance, to issue its own complaint" and apparent "Congress evidently considered that centralized administration of specially designed procedures was necessary to obtain uniform application of its substantive rules".

See also

United States labor law

References

External links
 

United States labor case law
1953 in United States case law
United States Supreme Court cases
United States Supreme Court cases of the Warren Court